Stephen López (born September 24, 1980) is a Belizean professional footballer who plays as a goalkeeper for Suga Boys Juventus.

External links
 

Living people
Association football goalkeepers
Belizean footballers
1980 births
Belize international footballers
2009 UNCAF Nations Cup players